Pound or Pounds may refer to:

Units
 Pound (currency), various units of currency
 Pound sterling, the official currency of the United Kingdom
 Pound (mass), a unit of mass
 Pound (force), a unit of force 
 Rail pound, in rail profile

Symbols
 Pound sign, the symbol for the pound sterling, £
 Number sign (also pound sign), the symbol #

Places in the United States
 Pound, Virginia, a town
 Pound, Wisconsin, a village
 Pound (town), Wisconsin, a town
 Pound Ridge, New York, a town

Entertainment
 Pound (band), an American rock band
 Pound (film), a 1970 film directed and written by Robert Downey, Sr.

Other uses
 Pound (surname), a list of people
 Animal shelter (also a "pound"), a facility that houses homeless, lost, or abandoned animals
 Animal pound, a similar structure  
 Canal pound, the stretch of level water impounded between two canal locks
 Fist bump (also a "pound" or a "fist pound"), a gesture similar in meaning to a handshake or high five
 Buffalo pound, a hunting structure used by indigenous North Americans to trap bison (buffalo)
 Pound (networking), a lightweight open source reverse proxy program and application firewall
 Pound (magazine), a Toronto-based hip hop magazine
 Pounds, shillings and pence or £sd, British and other European pre-decimal currency
Vehicle impoundment

See also